Naria spurca, common name the dirty cowry, is a species of sea snail, a cowry, a marine gastropod mollusk in the family Cypraeidae, the cowries.

Description
They are very variable in pattern and colour. The surface is smooth and shiny, the dorsum basic color is whitish or yellowish, with a variegated orange-brown, yellow ocher or reddish indistinct spotting on the dorsum. The yellowish margins are crenulated or bordered by a series of dimples. The base is whitish or cream, sometimes with shades of orange and some dark spots near the edge, while the teeth are usually large and white. In the living cowries the mantle is greyish, with quite long tree-shaped sensorial papillae.

Distribution
Naria spurca occurs in the central and southern Mediterranean Sea (southern Italy, Crete, Malta, Lampedusa Island, etc.), in the Red Sea (introduced) and in the eastern Atlantic Ocean along the West African coast (from Morocco to Angola, including Ascension Island, Canaries and Cape Verde Islands).

Habitat
During the day they are usually hidden under rocks, in crevices or in underwater meadows of Posidonia oceanica, as they start feeding at dusk.

Subspecies
 Naria spurca sanctaehelenae  (Schilder, 1930) 
 Naria spurca spurca  (Linnaeus, 1758) 
 Naria spurca verdensium  Melvill, 1888

References

 Repetto G., Orlando F. & Arduino G. (2005): Conchiglie del Mediterraneo, Amici del Museo "Federico Eusebio", Alba, Italy
 Prats Pi, L. (2002): Gastròpodes marins de la cala de Binissafúller, Menorca (Illes Balears)

External links
 Biolib
 Idscaro
 Diodata

Cypraeidae
Gastropods described in 1758
Taxa named by Carl Linnaeus
Molluscs of the Atlantic Ocean
Molluscs of the Mediterranean Sea